The Shenango River is a principal tributary of the Beaver River, approximately 100 mi (160 km) long, in western Pennsylvania in the United States.  It also briefly flows through small portions of northeastern Ohio.  Via the Beaver and Ohio Rivers, it is part of the watershed of the Mississippi River.

The Shenango, whose name comes from the Iroquoian "Shanango," meaning "the beautiful one," rises in west-central Crawford County and initially flows northwestwardly into the Pymatuning Reservoir, which was formed in 1934 by the construction of a dam on the river.  The lake turns to the south, widening into Ashtabula County, Ohio, and passing through Pymatuning State Park.  Below the dam and after returning fully to Pennsylvania, the Shenango flows south-southeastwardly into Mercer County, flowing through Jamestown and Greenville before turning westwardly into Shenango River Lake, formed in 1965 by a United States Army Corps of Engineers dam.  Below that dam, the Shenango flows southwestwardly through the communities of Sharpsville and Sharon (near which it briefly enters Trumbull County, Ohio); then south-southeastwardly past  Farrell, Wheatland and West Middlesex into Lawrence County, where it passes New Castle and Oakland.  It joins the Mahoning River to form the Beaver River, 3 mi (4.8 km) southwest of New Castle.

Tributaries of the Shenango include the short Little Shenango River, which flows for its entire length in Mercer County and joins the Shenango from the east at Greenville; Pymatuning Creek, which flows into Shenango River Lake; and Neshannock Creek, which joins the river at New Castle.

See also
 List of rivers of Ohio
 List of rivers of Pennsylvania

References

External links
 U.S. Geological Survey: PA stream gaging stations
 Shenango River Watchers

Rivers of Ashtabula County, Ohio
Rivers of Crawford County, Pennsylvania
Rivers of Lawrence County, Pennsylvania
Rivers of Mercer County, Pennsylvania
Rivers of Ohio
Rivers of Pennsylvania
Tributaries of the Beaver River
Rivers of Trumbull County, Ohio